Wingård, is a Danish-Swedish family of German origin from Stuttgart, Duchy of Württemberg, Holy Roman Empire. Hans Wyngarthener (circa 1500–1559) emigrated and settled the first printing press in Denmark in the 16th century. His great-grandson Anders Nielsen Wingaard (circa 1600–1649) relocated to Sweden as the fourth Lutheran Vicar in Krokstad parish, Diocese of Gothenburg, in Bohuslän. His great-great-great-grandson Carl Fredrik was ennobled af Wingård (n:o 2159) in 1799 on the merits of his father during the reign of King Gustav IV Adolf of Sweden.

Members in selection
 Johan Wingård (1738-1818), Bishop of the Diocese of Gothenburg and first holder of chair no. 6 of the Swedish Academy
 Johan Didrik af Wingård, (1778-1854), Lieutenant Colonel and Governor of Värmland County
 Carl Fredrik af Wingård (1781-1851), Archbishop of Uppsala, and Professor at Uppsala University

References

German families
Danish families
Swedish families
Swedish noble families
Swedish families of German ancestry